Manas Shah is an Indian television actor from Ahmedabad, India.

He started his career as an actor with the television show Hamari Devrani on Star Plus.

He has also featured in some television ads like  Lloyd.A.C & Kalyan muhurat bride by kalyan jewellers. .

Filmography

Gujarati films

Television

References

External links
http://www.gr8mag.com/posts.php?id=1119
http://www.tellychakkar.com/tv/tv-news/manas-shah-back-business-new-look-140704#
http://timesofindia.indiatimes.com/tv/news/gujarati/Manas-Shah-plays-the-lead-in-1760-Sasumaa/articleshow/45533417.cms
http://www.tellychakkar.com/tv/tv-news/manas-shah-enter-sony-tvs-amita-ka-amit
https://www.iwmbuzz.com/television/news/hamari-bahu-silk-manas-shah-joins-zaan-as-lead/2019/05/08
http://epaper.navgujaratsamay.com//indexnext.php?mod=1&pgnum=8&edcode=77&pagedate=2018-08-31&type=r

1988 births
Living people
21st-century Indian male actors
Indian male television actors
Male actors from Ahmedabad